Qatar competed at the 2017 World Games held in Wrocław, Poland.

Medalists

Beach handball 

The men's team won the bronze medal in the men's tournament.

References 

Nations at the 2017 World Games
2017 in Qatari sport
2017